The Suburbanite is a 1904 American short comedy silent film directed by Wallace McCutcheion and starring John Troiano. The film was produced and distributed by the American Mutoscope & Biograph Company. Prints exist in the Library of Congress film archive and in the Museum of Modern Art film archive.

Plot
The film is about a family who move to the suburbs, hoping for a quiet life. Things start to go wrong, and the wife gets violent and starts throwing crockery, leading to her arrest.

Cast
John Troiano

Reception
Pamela Robertson Wojcik considers the film to be a landmark film for actors, noting that the "comic characters had assumed a more central position in the mise-en-scene", and as a result, the actor's skills were "increasingly called upon to create a rudimentary character".

References

External links

1904 films
American silent short films
1904 comedy films
Silent American comedy films
Articles containing video clips
American black-and-white films
1904 short films
American comedy short films
Films directed by Wallace McCutcheon Sr.
1900s American films